HD 82785 is star in the southern constellation of Antlia. With an apparent visual magnitude of 6.43, it is near the lower limit of visibility to the naked eye. The distance to this star, based on parallax measurements, is 240 light years. It is drifting further away from the Sun with a radial velocity of 28 km/s, having come to within  some 1.7 million years ago. It has an absolute magnitude of 2.06.

This F-type star has a stellar classification of F2IV/V, displaying a blended luminosity class of a main sequence star combined to a more evolved subgiant star. It is 1.5 billion years old and is spinning with a projected rotational velocity of 36 km/s. The star has 1.68 times the mass and 2.43 times the radius of the Sun. HD 82785 is radiating 11.7 times the luminosity of the Sun from its photosphere at an effective temperature of 6,869 K.

There is a magnitude 9.21 star positioned at an angular separation of  along a position angle of 205° from the brighter component, as of 2016. This companion was first reported by W. S. Jacob in 1847.

References

External links
 Image HD 82785

F-type main-sequence stars
F-type subgiants
Antlia
Durchmusterung objects
082785
046874
3812